Eusthenomus wallisi is a species of beetle in the family Cerambycidae. It was described by Bates in 1875.

References

Anisocerini
Beetles described in 1875